South Indian Inscriptions is an epigraphical series that has been published by the Archaeological Survey of India in 34 volumes from 1890 through the present. The texts are supplemented with summaries and an overview of the texts, both in English The series was originally edited by archaeologist E. Dinesh, then V. Venkayya and Rai Bahadur.

Volumes 
 I: Tamil and Sanskrit Inscriptions from Stone and Copper-plate Edicts at Mamallapuram, Kanchipuram, in the North Arcot District, and other parts of the Madras Presidency. Chiefly collected in 1886-87.
 II: Tamil Inscriptions of Rajaraja, Rajendra-Chola, and others in the Rajarajesvara Temple at Tanjavur.
 Part I: Inscriptions on the Walls of the Central Shrine, with Four Plates.
 Part II: Inscriptions on the Walls of the Enclosure, with Four Plates.
 Part III: Supplement to the First and Second Volumes, with Eight Plates.
 Part IV: Other Inscriptions of the Temple.
 Part V: Pallava Copper-Plate Grants from Velurpalayam and Tandantottam (with Two Plates), including Title Page, Preface, Table of Contents, List of Plates, Addenda and Corrigenda, Introduction and Index of Volume II.
 III: Miscellaneous Inscriptions of the Tamil Country:
 Part I: Inscriptions at Ukkal, Melpadi, Karuvur, Manimangalam, and Tiruvallam.
 Part II: Inscriptions of Virarajendra I, Kulottunga-Chola I, Vikrama-Chola and Kulottunga-Chola III.
 Part III: Inscriptions of Aditya I, Parantaka I, Madiraikonda Rajakesarivarman, Parantaka II, Uttama-Chola, Parthivendravarman, Aditya-Karikala, and the Tiruvalangadu Plates.
 Part IV: Copper-plate Grants from Sinnamanur, Tirukkalar, and Tiruchchengodu.
 IV: Miscellaneous Inscriptions from the Tamil, Telugu and Kannada Countries and Ceylon (with Eleven Plates).
 V: Miscellaneous Inscriptions from the Tamil, Malayalam, Telugu and Kannada Countries (with Three Plates).
 VI: Miscellaneous Inscriptions from the Tamil, Telugu and Kannada Countries (with Five Plates).
 VII: Miscellaneous Inscriptions from the Tamil, Malayalam, Telugu and Kannada Countries.
 VIII: Miscellaneous Inscriptions from the Tamil, Malayalam, Telugu and Kannada Countries.
 IX: (Parts I and II) Kannada Inscriptions from the Madras Presidency.
 X: Telugu Inscriptions from Andhra Pradesh 
 XI: Bombay-Karnataka Inscriptions 
 XII: Pallava Inscriptions 
 XIII: Chola Inscriptions 
 XIV: Pandya Inscriptions 
 XV: Bombay-Karnataka Inscriptions 
 XVI: Telugu Inscriptions of the Vijayanagara Dynasty  
 XVII: Inscriptions collected during the year 1903-04 
 XVIII: 
 XIX: Inscriptions of Parakesarivarman 
 XX: Bombay-Karnataka Inscriptions 
 XXI: 
 XXII: (Parts I, II and III) Inscriptions collected during 1906 
 XXIII: 
 XXIV: 
 XXV: 
 XXVI: Inscriptions collected during the year 1908-09 
 XXVII: 
 XXVIII: 
 XXIX: 
 XXX: 
 XXXI: 
 XXXII: 
 XXXIII: 
 XXXIV:

See also

 Related topics
 Ancient iron production
 Ashokan Edicts in Delhi
 Ashoka's Major Rock Edicts
 Dhar iron pillar
 History of metallurgy in South Asia
 Iron pillar of Delhi
 List of Edicts of Ashoka 
 Pillars of Ashoka
 Other similar topics
 Early Indian epigraphy
 Hindu temple architecture
 History of India 
 Indian copper plate inscriptions
 Indian rock-cut architecture 
 List of rock-cut temples in India 
 Outline of ancient India

References 

Publications established in 1890
English-language mass media in India
Archaeology publications
Publications of the Archaeological Survey of India
Works about India
Medieval inscriptions